This page lists German naval ministers.

List

Reich Minister of the Navy in the Provisional Central Authority (1848–1849)

Chief of the Imperial Admiralty (1872–1889)

State Secretaries to the Imperial Navy Office of the German Empire (1889–1919)

Naval
Naval ministers
Naval history of Germany